The Katha Upanishad (Sanskrit: कठोपनिषद् or कठ उपनिषद्) is one of the mukhya (primary) Upanishads, embedded in the last eight short sections of the  school of the Krishna Yajurveda. It is also known as  Upanishad, and is listed as number 3 in the Muktika canon of 108 Upanishads.

The Katha Upanishad consists of two chapters (Adhyāyas), each divided into three sections (Vallis). The first Adhyaya is considered to be of older origin than the second. The Upanishad is the legendary story of a little boy, Nachiketa – the son of Sage Vajasravasa, who meets Yama (the deity of death). Their conversation evolves to a discussion of the nature of man, knowledge, Atman (Self) and moksha (liberation).

The chronology of Katha Upanishad is unclear and contested, but belongs to the later verse Upanishads, dated to the 5th to first centuries BCE.

The Kathaka Upanishad is an important ancient Sanskrit corpus of the Vedanta sub-schools, and an influential Śruti to the diverse schools of Hinduism. It asserts that "Atman (Self) exists", teaches the precept "seek Self-knowledge, which is Highest Bliss", and expounds on this premise like the other primary Upanishads of Hinduism. The Upanishad presents ideas that contrast Hinduism with Buddhism's assertion that "Soul, Self does not exist", and Buddhism's precept that one should seek "Emptiness (Śūnyatā), which is Highest Bliss". The detailed teachings of Katha Upanishad have been variously interpreted, as Dvaita (dualistic) and as Advaita (non-dualistic).

It is among the most widely studied Upanishads. Katha Upanishad was translated into Persian in 17th century, copies of which were then translated into Latin and distributed in Europe. Other philosophers such as Arthur Schopenhauer praised it, Edwin Arnold rendered it in verse as "The Secret of Death", and Ralph Waldo Emerson credited Katha Upanishad for the central story at the end of his essay Immortality, as well as his poem "Brahma".

Etymology
Katha (Sanskrit: कठ) literally means "distress". Katha is also the name of a sage, credited as the founder of a branch of the Krishna Yajur-veda, as well as the term for a female pupil or follower of Kathas school of Yajurveda. Paul Deussen notes that the Katha Upanishad uses words that symbolically embed and creatively have multiple meanings. For example, a closely pronounced word Katha (Sanskrit: कथा) literally means "story, legend, conversation, speech, tale". All of these related meanings are relevant to the Katha Upanishad.

Nachiketa, the boy and a central character in the Katha Upanishad legend, similarly, has closely related words with roots and meanings relevant to the text. Paul Deussen suggests Na kṣiti and Na aksiyete, which are word plays of and pronounced similar to Nachiketa, means "non-decay, or what does not decay", a meaning that is relevant to second boon portion of the Nachiketa story. Similarly, Na jiti is another word play and means "that which cannot be vanquished", which is contextually relevant to the Nachiketa's third boon. Both Whitney and Deussen independently suggest yet another variation to Nachiketa, with etymological roots that is relevant to Katha Upanishad: the word Na-ciketa also means "I do not know, or he does not know". Some of these Sanskrit word plays are incorporated within the Upanishad's text.

Like Taittiriya Upanishad of Yajurveda, each section of the Katha Upanishad is called a Valli (वल्ली), which literally means a medicinal vine-like climbing plant that grows independently yet is attached to a main tree. Paul Deussen states that this symbolic terminology is apt and likely reflects the root and nature of the Upanishads in Black Yajur veda, which too is largely independent of the liturgical Yajur Veda, and is attached to the main text.

Chronology
The chronology of Katha Upanishad is unclear and contested by scholars. All opinions rest on scanty evidence, an analysis of archaism, style and repetitions across texts, driven by assumptions about likely evolution of ideas, and on presumptions about which philosophy might have influenced which other Indian philosophies.

Richard King and A.L. Basham date the Katha Upanishad's composition roughly to the 5th century BCE, chronologically placing it after the first Buddhist Pali canons. Olivelle assigns the Katha Upanishad to the verse Upanishads, together with the Kena, Isa, Svetasvatara, and Mundaka, dating it to the first centuries BCE. Paul Deussen too considers Katha Upanishad to be a post-prose, yet earlier stage Upanishad composed about the time Kena and Isha Upanishads were, because of the poetic, mathematical metric structure of its hymns.

Stephen Phillips notes the disagreement between modern scholars. Phillips places the Katha Upanishad chronologically after Brihadaranyaka, Chandogya, Isha, Taittiriya, Aitareya and Kena, but before Mundaka, Prasna, Mandukya, Svetasvatara and Maitri Upanishads, as well as before the earliest Buddhist Pali and Jaina canons. Winternitz considers the Kathaka Upanishad as pre-Buddhist, pre-Jaina literature.

Structure
The Katha Upanishad has two chapters, each with three sections (valli), thus a total of six sections. The first section has 29 verses, the second section 25 verses, and the third presents 17. The second chapter opens with the fourth section of the Katha Upanishad and has 15 verses, while the fifth valli also has 15 verses. The final section has 17 verses.

The first chapter with the first three vallis is considered older, because the third section ends with a structure in Sanskrit that is typically found at closing of other Upanishads, and also because the central ideas are repeated though expanded in the last three sections, that is the second chapter. This, however, does not imply a significant gap between the two chapters, both chapters are considered ancient, and from 1st millennium BCE.

The origin of the story of the little boy named Nachiketa, contained in Katha Upanishad is of a much older origin. Nachiketa is mentioned in the verses of chapter 3.11 of Taittiriya Brahmana, both as a similar story, and as the name of one of five fire arrangements for rituals, along with Savitra, Caturhotra, Vaisvasrja and Aruna Agni.

The style and structure suggests that some of the verses in Katha Upanishad, such as 1.1.8, 1.1.16-1.1.18, 1.1.28 among others, are non-philosophical, do not fit with the rest of the text, and are likely to be later insertion and interpolations.

Content

The son questions his father - First Valli

The Upanishad opens with the story of Vajasravasa, also called Aruni Auddalaki Gautama, who gives away all his worldly possessions. However, his son Nachiketa (Sanskrit: नचिकेता) sees the charitable sacrifice as a farce, because all those worldly things have already been used to exhaustion, and are of no value to the recipients. The cows given away, for example, were so old that they had 'drank-their-last-water' (पीतोदकाः), 'eaten-their-last-grass' (जग्धतृणाः), 'don't give milk' (दुग्धदोहाः), 'who are barren' (निरिन्द्रियाः).  Concerned, the son asks his father,

Nachiketa does not die, but accepts his father's gifting him to Death, by visiting the abode of Yama - the deity of death in the Indian pantheon of deities. Nachiketa arrives, but Yama is not in his abode. Nachiketa as guest goes hungry for three nights, states verse 9 of the first Valli of Katha Upanishad. Yama arrives and is apologetic for this dishonor to the guest, so he offers Nachiketa three wishes.

Nachiketa' first wish is that Yama discharge him from the abode of death, back to his family, and that his father be calm, well-disposed, not resentful and same as he was before when he returns. Yama grants the first wish immediately, states verse 1.1.11 of Katha Upanishad.

For his second wish, Nachiketa prefaces his request with the statement that heaven is a place where there is no fear, no anxiety, no old age, no hunger, no thirst, no sorrow. He then asks Yama, in verse 1.1.13 of Katha Upanishad to be instructed as to the proper execution of fire ritual that enables a human being to secure heaven. Yama responds by detailing the fire ritual, including how the bricks should be arranged, and how the fire represents the building of the world. Nachiketa remembers what Yama tells him, repeats the ritual, a feat which pleases Yama, and he declares that this fire ritual will thereafter be called the "Nachiketa fires". Yama adds that along with "three Nachiketa fires", anyone who respects three bonds (with mother, father and teacher), does three kinds of karma (rituals, studies and charity), and understands the knowledge therein, becomes free of sorrow.

Nachiketa then asks for his third wish, asking Yama in verse 1.1.20, about the doubt that human beings have about "what happens after a person dies? Does he continue to exist in another form? or not?" The remaining verse of first Valli of Katha Upanishad is expression of reluctance by Yama in giving a straight "yes or no" answer. Yama states that even gods doubt and are uncertain about that question, and urges Nachiketa to pick another wish. Nachiketa says that if gods doubt that, then he "Yama" as deity of death ought to be the only one who knows the answer. Yama offers him all sorts of worldly wealth and pleasures instead, but Nachiketa says human life is short, asks Yama to keep the worldly wealth and pleasures to himself, declares that pompous wealth, lust and pleasures are fleeting and vain, then insists on knowing the nature of Atman (Self) and sticks to his question, "what happens after death?"

The theory of good versus dear - Second Valli

Yama begins his teaching by distinguishing between preya (प्रेय, प्रिय, dear, pleasant, gratifying), and shreya (श्रेय, good, beneficial excellence).

The verses 1.2.4 through 1.2.6 of Katha Upanishad then characterizes Knowledge/Wisdom as the pursuit of good, and Ignorance/Delusion as the pursuit of pleasant. The verses 1.2.7 through 1.2.11 of Katha Upanishad state Knowledge/Wisdom and the pursuit of good is difficult yet eternal, while Ignorance/Delusion and the pursuit of the pleasant is easy yet transient. Knowledge requires effort, and often not comprehended by man even when he reads it or hears it or by internal argument. The pursuit of Knowledge and the good, can be taught, learnt and thus realized.

A similar discussion and distinction between the pleasant and the beneficial is found in ancient Greek philosophy, such as in Phaedrus by Plato.

Atman exists, the theory of Yoga and the essence of Vedas - Second Valli
Katha Upanishad, in verses 1.2.12 asserts Atman – Self – exists, though it is invisible and full of mystery. It is ancient, and recognizable by Yoga (meditation on one's self), states Katha Upanishad. This is one of the earliest mentions of Yoga in ancient Sanskrit literature, in the context of Self-development and meditation.

In verses 1.2.14 through 1.2.22, the Katha Upanishad asserts that the essence of Veda is to make man liberated and free, look past what has happened and what has not happened, free from the past and the future, refocus his attention past Ignorance to Knowledge, to the means of blissful existence beyond joy and sorrow. This is achievable through realization of Atman-Brahman, asserts Katha Upanishad, and this essence is reminded in the Vedas through the word Om (Aum), state verses 1.2.15-1.2.16. That syllable, Aum, is in Brahman, means Brahman, means the Highest, means the Blissful within.

Yama is the spokesman in the second Valli of the Katha Upanishad. He asserts that man must not fear anyone or anything (not even death) as the true essence of man (Atman) is neither born nor dies; he is eternal, he is Brahman. These passages have been widely studied, and inspired Emerson among others:

In final verses of the second Valli, the Katha Upanishad asserts that Atman-knowledge, or Self-realization, is not attained by instruction, not arguments nor reasoning from scriptures. It is comprehended by oneself through meditation and introspection. It is not attained by those who do not abstain from misconduct, not those who are restless nor composed, not those whose mind is not calm and tranquil, but only those who live ethically, are composed, tranquil, internally peaceful, search within and examine their own nature. Similar ideas are repeated in the Mundaka Upanishad in chapter 3.2, another classic ancient scripture of Hinduism.

The parable of the chariot - Third Valli
The third Valli of Katha Upanishad presents the parable of the chariot, to highlight how Atman, body, mind, senses and empirical reality relate to a human being.

The Katha Upanishad asserts that one who does not use his powers of reasoning, whose senses are unruly and mind unbridled, his life drifts in chaos and confusion, his existence entangled in samsara. Those who use their intelligence, have their senses calm and under reason, they live a life of bliss and liberation, which is the highest place of Vishnu. Whitney clarifies that "Vishnu" appears in Vedas as a form of Sun, and "Vishnu's highest place" is a Vedic phrase that means "zenith". Madhvacharya, the Dvaita Vedanta scholar interprets this term differently, and bases his theistic interpretation of Katha Upanishad by stating that the term refers to the deity Vishnu.

This metaphorical parable of chariot is found in multiple ancient Indian texts, and is called the Ratha Kalpana. A similar simile is found in ancient Greek literature, such as the Parmenides, Xenophon's prologue of Prodikos, and in the Platonic dialogue Phaedrus.

The nature of Atman, need for ethics and the hierarchy of Reality - Third Valli
The Katha Upanishad, in verses 1.3.10 through 1.3.12 presents a hierarchy of Reality from the perspective of a human being. It asserts that Artha (objects, means of life) are above Indriya (senses), that Manas (mind) is above Artha in this hierarchy, above the Manas is Buddhi (intellect, his ability to discern), above the Buddhi is Atman (his Self, great Self). Beyond the Atman, states Katha Upanishad, is the Avyaktam (unmanifested Reality), and Purusha (cosmic Self) is beyond the Avyaktam, and beyond the Purusha, there is nothing - for it is the goal, for it is the highest road. At the basic level of life, the interaction is between Artha and Indriya (sensory organs); while at the highest level, man becomes aware of and holistically realizes the entire hierarchy. The Self is hidden in all beings, asserts the Katha Upanishad; it does not show itself, but its awareness is felt by seers with agrya sukshma (subtle, more self-evident conscious, keen thinkers).

In verse 1.3.13, Katha Upanishad states that Prajna (conscious man) should heed to the ethical precept of self-examination and self-restraint, restraining his speech and mind by the application of his Buddhi (power to reason). Man should, asserts Katha Upanishad, holistically unify his tempered senses and mind with his intellect, all these with his Atman (Self), and unify his "great Self" with the Self of the rest, the tranquility of Oneness with the Avyaktam and "cosmic Self". Self (Atman) is soundless, touchless, formless, tasteless, scentless, without beginning, without end, imperishable, beyond great, blissful, and when one reveres one's own Self, he is liberated. Such Self-realization is not easy according to Katha Upanishad,

Paul Deussen states that verses 1.3.10 to 1.3.13 of Katha Upanishad is one of the earliest mentions of the elements of Yoga theory, and the recommendation of Yoga as a path to the highest goal of man, that is a life of spiritual freedom and liberation. This theory is significantly expanded upon in the second chapter of Katha Upanishad, particularly in the sixth Valli.

The theory of Atman, Oneness and Plurality - Fourth Valli
The fourth Valli starts by asserting that inner knowledge is that of unity, eternal calmness and spiritual Oneness, while the external knowledge is that of plurality, perishable "running around" and sensory objects. The Katha Upanishad in fifteen verses of the fourth Valli, as well as those the fifth Valli, explains what is Atman, how it can be known, the nature of Atman, and why it ought to be known. For definition, it deploys an epistemic combination of "positive assertions" as well as "exposition by elimination", the latter repeated with,

Atman, asserts Katha Upanishad, is the subject of Self-knowledge, the bearer of spiritual reality, that which is all-pervading, inside every being, which unifies all human beings as well as all creatures, the concealed, eternal, immortal, pure bliss. It exists and active when man is in awake-state, it exists and active when man is in dream-state. The empirical reality is the "honey" for the Atman, with the honey metaphor repeating "fruit of numerous karma flowers in the valley of life" doctrine found in other Upanishads, such as in the second chapter of Brihadaranyaka Upanishad. To know Atman, look inward and introspect; to know objects, look outward and examine, states Katha Upanishad. Everything that changes is not Atman, that which was, is, will be and never changes is Atman. Just like a baby is concealed inside a mother's womb when conceived, Atman is concealed inside every creature, states verse 2.4.8 of Katha Upanishad.

Self is the lord of the past, the lord of the now, and the lord of the future. Self is eternal, never born, never dies, part of that which existed before the universe was formed from "brooding heat". Sun rests in it, gods rest in it, all nature rests in it, it is everywhere, it is in everything. To understand the eternal nature of one's Self is to feel calmness, inner peace, patience and freedom regardless of the circumstances one is in, affections or threats one faces, praises or insults one is subjected to. Anyone who runs after sensory-impressions, gets lost among them just like water flows randomly after rainfall on mountains, state verses 2.4.14 and 2.4.15 of the Katha Upanishad; and those who know their Self and act according to its Dharma remain pure like pure water remains pure when poured into pure water.

There is no plurality and separateness between the essence (Atman) of I and others, between the essence of nature and spirit, asserts Katha Upanishad in verses 2.4.10 and 2.4.11. The Self-driven individual ignores the superficial individuality of others, and accepts their essential identity. Paul Deussen suggests that verses 2.4.6 and 2.4.7 posit a nondualistic (Advaita) position, where both Purusha and Prakrti are only Atman. This position contrasts with one of the fundamental premises of the dualistic schools of Hinduism. Shankara agrees with this interpretation. Ramanuja doesn't and offers a theistic dualism based interpretation instead.

Life is highest joy, and what happens after death - Fifth Valli
Katha Upanishad's fifth Valli is an eschatological treatise. It begins by stating that human body is like a Pura (Sanskrit: पुर, town, city) with eleven gates that connect him to the universe. The individual, asserts Katha Upanishad, who understands and reveres this town of eternal, non-changing spirit, is never crooked-minded, is always free. The Self dwells in swan, in atmosphere, in man, in Varasad (wide spaces), in eternal law, everywhere in the universe; it is born of water, it is born of kine, it is born of Ṛta (right, truth, ethics, morals, eternal law), it is born of stone (mountains) as the great Ṛta, as ought to be. This Self is worshipped by all the gods. Body dies, Self doesn't.

In verses 2.5.6 and 2.5.7, the Katha Upanishad discusses what happens to the Self after death, stating a variant of the premise of Karma theory that underlies major Indian religions,

The Self is always awake and active, while one is asleep, shaping wishful dreams. It is one with Brahman. It is everywhere, within and without, it is immortal. This universal, oneness theme is explained by the Katha Upanishad by three similes, which Paul Deussen calls as excellent. Just like one light exists and penetrates the cosmic space, enveloping and clinging to everything and every form individually, the "one inner Self" of beings exists and dwells in all beings, clings to every form and remains still without, states the Katha Upanishad. Just like one air exists and penetrates the world, enveloping and clinging to everything and every being individually, the "one inner Self" of beings exists and dwells in all beings, clings to every form and remains still without. Just like the Sun exists and its nature is not contaminated by the impurities seen by the eyes, the "one inner Self" of beings exists and its nature is pure, never contaminated by the sorrows and blemishes of the external world. Parts of the ideas in these first two similes of Katha Upanishad are of far more ancient origins, and found for example in Book 6, Chapter 47 of Rig veda.

That individual is perennially happy, asserts Katha Upanishad, who realizes the Atman is within him, that he himself is the Master, that the inner Self of all beings and his own Self are "one form manifold", and none other. Life is spirit,  full of joy. Meaning is Atman, full of perennial peace. "Truly, this is that", once deeply felt and understood by man, is inexpressible highest joy. It is he who realizes this who shines, his splendour shines everything with and by (Anu), the whole world shines by such joy unleashed, such splendour manifested.

The theory of Yoga - Sixth Valli
The sixth Valli continues the discussion of Karma and rebirth theory, sections of which Max Muller states is possibly interpolated and inserted in a later period. The first five verses of the last section of the Upanishad assert that those who do not know or do not understand Atman return to the world of creation, and those who do are free, liberated. Some unaware of Brahman's essence are naturally inclined to fear God and its manifestation such as nature (fire, lightning, sun), state verses 2.6.2 and 2.6.3 of Katha Upanishad. Those who are aware of Brahman's essence, are awakened to the knowledge, fear no one and nothing, become immortal as with Brahman.

The Katha Upanishad, in verses 2.6.6 through 2.6.13 recommends a path to Self-knowledge, and this path it calls Yoga.

Realize you are perfect now and here - Sixth Valli
The Katha Upanishad concludes its philosophical presentation in verses 14-15 of the sixth Valli. The state of perfection, according to the last section of the Upanishad, explains Paul Deussen, consists "not in the attainment of a future or yonder world, but it is already just now and here for one who is Self-realized, who knows his Self as Brahman (Cosmic Self)". This teaching is also presented in the other ancient scriptures of Hinduism, such as Brihadaranyaka Upanishad's Chapter 4.4.6.

The verse 15 of the sixth Valli declares that the Upanishad concludes its teaching therein. Yet, the Valli contains three additional verses in modern era manuscripts. Scholars suggest that these remaining verses 2.6.16 – 2.6.18 are possibly modern additions as appendix and have been interpolated. This is due to the declaration of Upanishad's end in verse 15, and the additional three verses that are structured in prose-like manner, rather than the poetic, metric-perfection that Katha Upanishad is largely written in.

Reception
Charles Johnston has called Katha Upanishad as one of the highest spiritual texts, with layers of metaphors embedded therein. To Johnston, the three nights and three boons in the first Valli of Katha Upanishad, for example, are among the text's many layers, with the three connoting the past, the present and the future.

The Irish poet William Butler Yeats dedicated several essays and sonnets to themes in Katha Upanishad and related ancient Upanishads of India. George William Russell similarly esteemed the Katha and other Upanishads. The American poet Ralph Waldo Emerson held Katha Upanishad highly, and wrote several poems and essays paralleling the themes in it.

The various themes contained in Katha Upanishad have been subject of many scholarly works. For example, Elizabeth Schiltz has compared "the parable of the chariot" in Katha Upanishad and Platonic dialogue "Phaedrus", noting the "remarkable similarities give rise to a great many tantalizing historical and literary questions", and adding the comment, "each provides an image of the self as the chariot, they each offer a complex moral psychology, and point toward an effective justification of the best life". Radhakrishnan notes that Katha Upanishad's discussion of "good versus pleasant" is evidence of ethical theories and philosophical longings of ancient human beings in India by 1st millennium BCE, much like those in Greek city states in Europe.

In popular culture
A verse in the Upanishad inspired the title and the epigraph of W. Somerset Maugham's 1944 novel The Razor’s Edge, later adapted, twice, into films of the same title (see articles on 1946 and 1984 films). The epigraph reads, "The sharp edge of a razor is difficult to pass over; thus the wise say the path to Salvation is hard." taken from a verse in the Katha-Upanishad – 1.3.14. Maugham had visited India in 1938 and met Ramana Maharishi at his ashram in Tamil Nadu.

Filmmaker Ashish Avikunthak made a film based on this Upanishad called “Katho Upanishad” which was first shown as a video installation at Gallery Chatterjee & Lal in Mumbai in 2012. 

Roger Zelazny included a quote from the Katha Upanishad as dialogue between two characters in his novel, Lord of Light.

An English poetry version of Katha Upanishad by B. P. Khattri is available online and can be accessed at  https://www.researchgate.net/publication/343788311_Kathopnishad . The stanzas directly align with those in the Gita Press version of Katha Upnishad.

See also
Chariot Allegory

Notes

References

Sources

Further reading
Deutsch, Eliot & Rohit Dalvi (Editors) (2004). The Essential Vedānta: A New Source Book of Advaita Vedānta. Bloomington, Indiana, USA: World Wisdom, 

Sarvananda, Swami (1987). Kathopanisad (14th ed.). Madras, India: Sri Ramakrishna Math. (Including original verses, constructed text, and word-by-word translations).
Radhakrishnan, S. (1994). The Principal Upanishads (see article). New Delhi: HarperCollins Publishers India.  (translation and commentary on Katha Upanishad is in pp. 593–648) (original publication, 1953).

External links

Translations
Multiple translations (Raja Ram Mohun Roy, Charles Johnston, Swāmi Nikhilānanda)
Katha Upanishad in The Thirteen Principal Upanishads, Robert Hume (Translation with some creative recomposition)
Katha Upanishad Translated by Sanderson Beck, in Wisdom of China and India
Translation and commentary by Swami Paramananda
 The Katha Upanishad with Shankara’s Commentary Translated by S. Sitarama Sastri, online ebook

Text
 Kāṭha-Upaniṣad edited by Marcos Albino, Erlangen 1996; Transliterated TITUS version by Jost Gippert
 

Recitation
 Katha Upanishad recited by Pt. Ganesh Vidyalankar
 First from Compilation of Seven Discourses translating Sanskrit to English via mp3 audio
 Recitation by Swami Atmajnananda
Resources
 Video/Audio classes, Reference texts, Discussions and other Study material on Katha Upanishad at Vedanta Hub

Upanishads